The women's high jump at the 2014 European Athletics Championships took place at the Letzigrund on 15 and 17 August 2014.

Medalists

Records

World best results in 2014 
The world best results in Europe in 2014 before the European Athletics Championships are :

Schedule

Results

Qualification

Qualification: Qualification Performance 1.94 (Q) or at least 12 best performers advance to the final.

Final

References

High Jump W
High jump at the European Athletics Championships
2014 in women's athletics